The 2002 Queensland Cup season was the 7th season of Queensland's top-level statewide rugby league competition run by the Queensland Rugby League. The competition featured 12 teams playing a 26-week long season (including finals) from March to September.

The Redcliffe Dolphins defeated the Ipswich Jets 34–10 in the Grand Final at Dolphin Oval to claim their third premiership. Easts  Scott Thorburn was named the competition's Player of the Year, winning the Courier Mail Medal.

Teams 
The Queensland Cup returned to a 12-team format in 2002 with the inclusion of the North Queensland Young Guns, who served as the North Queensland Cowboys feeder club.

Along with the Cowboys using the Young Guns as their affiliate, the Brisbane Broncos and Melbourne Storm were again affiliated with the Toowoomba Clydesdales and Norths Devils, respectively.

Ladder

Finals series

Grand Final 

Redcliffe finished the regular season with the minor premiership, their third, and cruised through the finals. After earning a first round bye, they defeated Ipswich by a point in the major semi final, qualifying for their sixth overall and fourth consecutive Grand Final. Ipswich qualified for the finals for the first time after finishing third, and defeated the East Coast Tigers in the first week of the playoffs. The loss to Redcliffe saw them face Norths in the preliminary final, in which they won 29–26 to set up a rematch with the Dolphins in the Grand Final. In the regular season, Redcliffe defeated Ipswich on both occasions (20–18 in Round 2 and 24–12 in Round 12).

First half 
It took just 10 seconds for tensions to flare in the decider after Jets' prop Danny McAllister was hit with a high tackle from the kick off by Dolphins' captain Luke Scott. An all-in brawl erupted, with both teams coming together in a melee. Moments after the referees had finally regained order, the fight erupted again between Scott and McAllister. Both players were subsequently sent to the sin bin. In the 12th minute, Redcliffe opened the scoring through winger Aaron Barba. It was a dominant first half for the Dolphins, who led 22–0 at half time after tries to Bara (his second), Damien Richters and Barry Berrigan added tries.

Second half 
Three minutes into the second half, Redcliffe pushed their lead to 28 when winger Phil Shilvock scored, the try all but wrapping up the game. Ipswich finally got on the scoreboard in the 49th minute when winger Steven West latched onto a Ricky Bird grubber. Redcliffe scored again in the 61st minute, when a pinpoint Shane Perry chip kick found Trent Leis, who scored in his third Grand Final. Jets' centre Aaron Bulow scored seven minutes later but the game was well out of reach for Ipswich, as Redcliffe secured their third premiership. Dolphins' hooker Barry Berrigan was named man of the match.

The victorious Redcliffe side featured two players who would play in the Brisbane Broncos 2006 NRL Grand Final win over the Melbourne Storm, with Shane Perry starting at halfback and David Stagg starting at centre in the victory.

Player statistics

Leading try scorers

Leading point scorers

End-of-season awards 
 Courier Mail Medal: Scott Thorburn ( Easts Tigers)
 Rookie of the Year: David Stagg ( Redcliffe Dolphins)

See also 

 Queensland Cup
 Queensland Rugby League

References 

2002 in Australian rugby league
Queensland Cup